Muhammad Arif Habib (b. 1953) is a Pakistani business magnate and stock market trader who is the founder of the Arif Habib Group. As of 2012, Arif Habib Group had 11,000 employees and annual revenue of Rs. 100 billion. He also serves as member of Boards of Governors of Karachi School of Business and Leadership (KSBL).

Early life
Habib was born to a Memon family in Karachi as the youngest of nine siblings. His family were from Bantva, Gujarat, where they owned a tea venture and several properties. Following the independence of Pakistan in 1947, they left behind their businesses and migrated to Pakistan. He enjoys cricket and is a noted philanthropist, serving as a trustee of organisations such as Fatimid Foundation and Memon Health and Education Foundation, and as director of the Pakistan Centre for Philanthropy (PCP) and Karachi Education Initiative.

Business career
In 1970, at the young age of 17, Habib began his career as a stockbroker at the Karachi Stock Exchange (KSE), hired by his elder brother who bought a trading license. His monthly salary was 60 rupees. He spent his days in the trading hall analysing shares and statements for investors, which he credits as having contributed to his knowledge of stocks. In 1992, Habib was voted president of the KSE and he computerised the stock trading system. He was elected president of the KSE five more times. His reforms accelerated trade and he expanded his business. In 2000, he founded Pakistan's second asset management company which currently manages over $430 million (Rs. 49 billion).

With Pakistan's state-owned companies undergoing a process of privatisation at that time, Habib bought stakes in fertiliser, cement and steel production, as well as banking. Since 2004, his business has invested over $2 billion into these various sectors. In 2008, regulatory curbs on stock trading as a result of the financial crisis of 2007–2008 resulted in Habib's stock clients defaulting, as the KSE 100 Index fell by 48% within two months. However, his business recovered following a rise in corporate earnings.

In addition to his role at KSE, Habib was a founding member of the Central Depository Company. He has also served as a member of the Privatisation Commission, Board of Investment, and the Securities and Exchange Ordinance Review Committee. The government of Pakistan has appointed him into the board of governors for several companies.

References

1953 births
Businesspeople from Karachi
Living people
Memon people
Pakistani chief executives
Pakistani investors
Pakistani people of Gujarati descent
Pakistani philanthropists
Pakistani stock traders